Doli Akhter, born 15 January 1986, is an Olympic swimmer from Bangladesh.

She has swum for Bangladesh at the 2000, 2004 and 2008 Olympics. On all three occasions, she attended thanks to a wild card qualification.

She competed in the 100m breaststroke in Sydney (2000), where she was disqualified. In Athens (2004), she competed in the 50m freestyle. She won her heat with a time of 30.72, which was not sufficient for her to advance to the next round.

Akhter won a silver medal in the 200m breaststroke event at the South Asian Games in Islamabad in 2004.

She is Bangladesh's sole athlete at the 2009 World Championships (July 2009).

References

External links
 

1986 births
Living people
Bangladeshi female swimmers
Olympic swimmers of Bangladesh
Swimmers at the 2000 Summer Olympics
Swimmers at the 2004 Summer Olympics
Swimmers at the 2008 Summer Olympics
Commonwealth Games competitors for Bangladesh
Swimmers at the 2010 Commonwealth Games
Swimmers at the 2006 Asian Games
Asian Games competitors for Bangladesh
South Asian Games silver medalists for Bangladesh
South Asian Games bronze medalists for Bangladesh
South Asian Games medalists in swimming